Singularity Education Group (using the public names Singularity Group, Singularity University or SingularityU) is an American company that offers executive educational programs, a business incubator, and business consultancy services. Although the company uses the word "university" in its branding, it is not an accredited university and has no academic programs or accreditation.

The company has faced allegations of sexual assault, embezzlement, and discrimination since its founding.

History

2008–2011 (non-profit) 
Singularity was founded as a non-profit and initially offered an annual 10-week summer program called the Graduate Studies Program (GSP), it was aimed at individuals wanting to understand how they could use technology to tackle global challenges. Its original Corporate founding partners and sponsors included Google, Nokia, Autodesk,IDEO, LinkedIn, the X Prize Foundation, ePlanet Ventures, the Kauffman Foundation and Genentech. Google subsequently ended its grant of $1.5 million annually.

2012–present (private company)

2012 
Singularity University began the process for conversion to a for-profit benefit corporation. In 2013, the new for-profit corporation incorporated as "Singularity Education Group" and acquired "Singularity University" as its trade name.

2018 
Faculty leaders noted that the company was focused only on profit; "it's lost its soul...It’s become a moneymaking corporation."

2019 
Singularity acquired Futurism News.

Singularity moved its headquarters from the NASA Research Park at NASA Ames to Santa Clara.

Singularity added new Country Partner franchises in Brazil and Australia.

2021 
Futurism.com was sold to Recurrent Ventures.

2022 
Pioneer Adaptive Learning Platform was acquired by Talespin.

Executive Program
The Executive Program is a series of five-day training programs that focus on how topics relating to technology and its impacts on business.

Global Impact Competition 
In 2016, SingularityU The Netherlands organized a Global Impact Competition for Dutch entrepreneurs. Danny Wagemans, a 21-year-old nanophysics student, won the first prize to participate in the 10-week Global Solutions Program. He demonstrated how clean water and energy can be derived from urine by combining a microbial fuel cell and a graphene filter in a water bottle.

Singularity Hub
Singularity Hub is a science and tech media website published by Singularity University. Singularity Hub was founded in 2008 with the mission of "providing news coverage of sci/tech breakthroughs that are rapidly changing human abilities, health, and society". It was acquired by Singularity University in 2012, to make content produced by Singularity University more accessible.

In March 2018, Singularity Hub released 695 articles via Creative Commons license CC BY-ND 4.0.

SU Labs
SU Labs is a seed accelerator by Singularity University, targeting startups that aim to "change the lives of a billion people."

In 2011, a Singularity University group launched Matternet, a startup that aims to harness drone technology to ship goods in developing countries that lack highway infrastructure. Other startups from SU are the peer-to-peer car-sharing service Getaround, and BioMine, which uses mining technologies to extract value from electronic waste.

Controversies 
An investigative report from Bloomberg Businessweek found many issues with the organization, including an alleged sexual harassment of a student by a teacher, theft and aiding of theft by an executive, and allegations of gender and disability discrimination. Several early members of Singularity University were convicted of crimes, including Bruce Klein, who was convicted in 2012 of running a credit fraud operation in Alabama and Naveen Jain who was convicted of insider trading in 2003.

In February 2021, during the COVID-19 pandemic, MIT Technology Review reported that a group owned by Singularity, called Abundance 360, had held a "mostly maskless" event in Santa Monica in violation of the local stay-at-home order that became a superspreading event. The event, led by Singularity co-founder Peter Diamandis, charged up to $30,000 for tickets. In a followup article, MIT Technology Review revealed that after COVID-19 started spreading among attendees, Diamandis tried to sell them "fraudulent" treatments including inhaled amniotic fluid and ketamine lozenges, which a professor of law and medicine at Stanford University characterized as "quackery". The superspreading event was covered widely by publications including the New York Times, the Washington Post, and the Los Angeles Times.

References

External links
 

Educational organizations based in the United States
Benefit corporations